Carlos Alberto Sintas (born 31 December 1952 in Montevideo, Uruguay) is a Uruguayan former professional footballer who played as a forward in Uruguay, Chile and Austria.

Clubs 
 Tacuarembó 1966–1973
 Huachipato 1973–1976
 Ñublense 1976–1978
 Austria Wien 1978–1979

Honours 
Huachipato
 Chilean Primera División: 1974

References

External links 
 
 

1952 births
Living people
Uruguayan footballers
Association football forwards
Austrian Football Bundesliga players
Tacuarembó F.C. players
Ñublense footballers
C.D. Huachipato footballers
FK Austria Wien players
Chilean Primera División players
Uruguayan expatriate footballers
Uruguayan expatriate sportspeople in Chile
Expatriate footballers in Chile
Uruguayan expatriate sportspeople in Austria
Expatriate footballers in Austria